The National Anti-Corruption Commission may refer to:
National Anti-Corruption Commission (Thailand)
National Anti-Corruption Commission (Saudi Arabia)
National Anti-Corruption Commission (Australia)